The 1933 Tulsa Golden Hurricane football team represented the University of Tulsa during the 1933 college football season. In their ninth year under head coach Gus Henderson, the Golden Hurricane compiled a 6–1 record. The team gave up an average of only 2.6 points per game, defeated Oklahoma (20–6) and Arkansas (7–0), but lost to Oklahoma A&M (7–0).

Schedule

References

Tulsa
Tulsa Golden Hurricane football seasons
Tulsa Golden Hurricane football